Podolí I is a municipality and village in Písek District in the South Bohemian Region of the Czech Republic. It has about 400 inhabitants.

Administrative parts
Villages of Podolsko and Rastory are administrative parts of Podolí I.

References

Villages in Písek District